Raz (also Romanized as Rāz') is a village in Bala Jowayin Rural District, in the Central District of Jowayin County, Razavi Khorasan Province, Iran. At the 2006 census, its population was 4,057, in 1,043 families.

References 

Populated places in Joveyn County